Baranagar Assembly constituency is an assembly constituency in North 24 Parganas district in the Indian state of West Bengal.

Overview
As per orders of the Delimitation Commission, No. 113  Baranagar Assembly constituency is composed of the following: Baranagar municipality and Ward Nos.17 to 20 of Kamarhati municipality.

Baranagar Assembly constituency is part of No. 16 Dum Dum (Lok Sabha constituency).

Members of Legislative Assembly

Election results

2021

In the 2021 election, Tapas Roy of AITC defeated his nearest rival Parno Mitra of BJP.

 

,

2016
In the 2016 election, Tapas Roy of AITC defeated his nearest rival Sukumar Ghosh of RSP.

2011
In the 2011 elections, Tapas Roy of Trinamool Congress defeated his nearest rival Sukumar Ghosh of RSP.

.# Swing calculated on Congress+Trinamool Congress vote percentages taken together in 2006.

1977-2006
In the 2006, 2001 and 1996 state assembly elections, Amar Chaudhuri of RSP won the Baranagar assembly seat defeating his nearest rivals Atin Ghosh of Trinamool Congress in 2006 and 2001, and Silbhadra Dutta of Congress in 1996. Contests in most years were multi cornered but only winners and runners are being mentioned. Matish Roy of RSP defeated Ajoy Ghoshal of Congress in 1991, Pranab Kanti Ghosh of Congress in 1987, Sambhu Nath Dutta of Congress in 1982, and Kumud Bhattacharjee of Congress in 1977.

1951-1972
Shiba Pada Bhattacharjee of CPI defeated Jyoti Basu of CPI(M) in 1972. Jyoti Basu, representing CPI(M) from 1967 onwards and undivided CPI prior to that, won the Baranagar seat in 1971, 1969, 1967,1962,1957 and in independent India's first election in 1951.

References

Assembly constituencies of West Bengal
Politics of North 24 Parganas district
Baranagar